The Play-offs of the 2010 Fed Cup Asia/Oceania Zone Group I were the final stages of the Group I Zonal Competition involving teams from Asia and Oceania. Using the positions determined in their pools, the eight teams faced off to determine their placing in the 2010 Fed Cup Asia/Oceania Zone Group I. The top team advanced to the World Group II, and the bottom team was relegated down to the Group II for the next year.

Promotion play-offs
The first placed teams of each pool were placed against each other in a head-to-head round. The winner of the rounds advanced to the World Group II play-offs, where they would get a chance to advance to the World Group II for next year.

Japan vs. Chinese Taipei

Third to Fourth play-offs
The second-placed teams from each pool were drawn in head-to-head rounds to find the third and fourth placed teams.

South Korea vs. Kazakhstan

Fifth to Sixth play-off
The third placed teams of each pool were placed against each other in a ties. The winner of the tie was allocated fifth place in the Group while the loser was allocated sixth.

New Zealand vs. Thailand

Relegation play-offs
The last placed teams of each pool were placed against each other in a head-to-head round. The losing team was relegated to Group II for next year.

Indonesia vs. Uzbekistan

Final Placements

  advanced to the World Group II Play-offs, and were drawn against . They lost 1–4, and thus was relegated back to Group I for 2011.
  was relegated down to Asia/Oceania Zone Group II for the next year, where they placed first overall and thus achieved advancement back to Group I for 2012.

See also
Fed Cup structure

References

External links
 Fed Cup website

2009 Fed Cup Asia/Oceania Zone